The Brown County Courthouse, located at 601 Oregon Street in Hiawatha, is the seat of government of Brown County, Kansas. Hiawatha has been the county seat since 1858. The courthouse was built from 1925 to 1926 by contractor Harvey E. Wood. 

Architect William Earl Hulse & Company of Hutchinson, Kansas designed the courthouse in the Neoclassical style. The courthouse is three stories and faces north. It is constructed of limestone and concrete. It is located on spacious landscaped grounds in the center of the city. The north and south sides are nearly identical and both have entrances, with the north side having three. Four Corinthian columns rise from the second story to the third story. The courthouse is part of the Hiawatha Courthouse Square Historic District.

The current courthouse is the third structure used as a courthouse. The first courthouse was a frame, two-story structure built in 1858 at a cost of $2,000; it was demolished in 1880. The second courthouse was a two-story brick structure built in 1879 for $20,000 by James A. McGonigle and designed by E. P. Carr. 

William Earl Hulse & Company also designed the Barton County Courthouse, the Kiowa County Courthouse, the Osage County Courthouse, the Pawnee County Courthouse, the Reno County Courthouse, the Wallace County Courthouse, and the Wichita County Courthouse.

See also
 List of county courthouses in Kansas

External links
 Brown County at American Courthouses
 Historic postcard images

Buildings and structures in Brown County, Kansas
County courthouses in Kansas
Neoclassical architecture in Kansas
Government buildings completed in 1926